General elections were held in the Ottoman Empire in 1914. The Committee of Union and Progress (CUP) was the only party to contest the elections, and the newly elected Chamber of Deputies convened for the first time in May.

Background
Following Ottoman military failures in the First Balkan War, Grand Vizier Kâmil Pasha was overthrown by a CUP-led coup in January 1913. Kâmil Pasha was hostile to the CUP, and had been determined to use his appointment to destroy the party.

After the coup the CUP was able to bring the cabinet under its control. Following the assassination of the new Grand Vizier Mahmud Shevket Pasha in June, the CUP was able to crush its political rival, the Liberal Entente, whose supporters had been involved in the assassination. The Entente was also weakened as the Empire lost territory in the Balkans, where many of its Christian supporters were based. The CUP made efforts to win support in the Arab provinces by making conciliatory gestures to Arab leaders, which also weakened Arab support for the Entente and enabled the CUP to call elections with unionists holding the upper hand.

Conduct
Electoral fraud and coercion led to protests in several parts of the Empire. In Hama 27 of the 48 secondary voters signed a petition concerning the election in Homs. When Hama was due to vote, two-thirds of the voters refused to report to the polling station in protest at the conduct of the Homs election. Similar boycotts occurred in Acre due to irregularities in Safed and Tiberias.

See also
5th Chamber of Deputies of the Ottoman Empire

References

Ottoman Empire
Ottoman Empire
Elections in the Ottoman Empire
One-party elections
1914 in the Ottoman Empire